Hypopterygium is a genus of moss in the family Hypopterygiaceae. It contains the following species:
 Hypopterygium arbuscula Brid.
 Hypopterygium arcuatum (Hedw.) Müll. Hal.
 Hypopterygium balantii (Kindb.) Müll. Hal. ex Loeske
 Hypopterygium ciliatum (Hedw.) Brid.
 Hypopterygium concinnum (Hook.) Brid.
 Hypopterygium convolutaceum Müll. Hal.
 Hypopterygium didictyon Müll. Hal.
 Hypopterygium discolor Mitt.
 Hypopterygium elatum Tixier
 Hypopterygium filiculaeforme (Hedw.) Brid.
 Hypopterygium flavolimbatum Müll. Hal.
 Hypopterygium hildebrandtii (Kindb.) Müll. Hal. ex Paris
 Hypopterygium hookerianum (Griff.) A.J. Shaw, I. Holz, C. J. Cox & Goffinet
 Hypopterygium javanicum (Hampe) A. Jaeger
 Hypopterygium lutescens Hornsch.	
 Hypopterygium pallens (Hook. f. & Wilson) Mitt.
 Hypopterygium parvifolium (Bosch & Sande Lac.) A.J. Shaw, I. Holz, C. J. Cox & Goffinet
 Hypopterygium pinnatum (Hampe) A. Jaeger
 Hypopterygium rotulatum (Hedw.) Brid.
 Hypopterygium sandwicense Broth.
 Hypopterygium spectabile (Reinw. & Hornsch.) Müll. Hal.
 Hypopterygium struthiopteris (Brid.) Brid.
 Hypopterygium tamarisci (Sw.) Brid. ex Müll. Hal.
 Hypopterygium tamariscinum (Hedw.) Brid.
 Hypopterygium thouinii (Schwägr.) Mont.
 Hypopterygium tomentosum (Hedw.) Müll. Hal.
 Hypopterygium viridulum Mitt.
 Hypopterygium vriesei Bosch & Sande Lac.

References

Bryopsida
Moss genera